6189 Völk is a stony Vesta asteroid, approximately  in diameter, located in the inner regions of the asteroid belt. It was discovered on 2 March 1989, by Belgian astronomer Eric Elst at the La Silla Observatory in northern Chile. The S-type asteroid has a short rotation period of 2.9 hours. It was named for Elisabeth Völk, a staff member at ESO headquarters in Germany.

Classification and orbit 

When applying the synthetic hierarchical clustering method to its proper orbital elements, Völk is a core member of the stony Vesta family, one of the largest families in the inner asteroid belt. It orbits the Sun in the inner main-belt at a distance of 2.0–2.6 AU once every 3 years and 6 months (1,278 days; semi-major axis of 2.3 AU). Its orbit has an eccentricity of 0.13 and an inclination of 6° with respect to the ecliptic.

Naming 

This minor planet was named after Elisabeth Völk (born 1946), administrative staff member at ESO's headquarters in Germany, in charge of the ESO Schmidt plates archive, who became a good friend of the discoverer. The naming was independently suggested by astronomer and author of the Dictionary of Minor Planets, Lutz Schmadel. The  was published by the Minor Planet Center on 15 February 1995.

Physical characteristics 

In the SDSS-based taxonomy, Völk is a common, stony S-type asteroid.

Lightcurve 

In September 2015, a rotational lightcurve was constructed from photometric observations by Robert D. Stephens at the Center for Solar System Studies in California .

Diameter 

Notes

References

External links 
 ESO Schmidt Plates, Query Form
 Asteroid Lightcurve Database (LCDB), query form (info )
 Dictionary of Minor Planet Names, Google books
 Discovery Circumstances: Numbered Minor Planets (5001)-(10000) – Minor Planet Center
 
 

006189
Discoveries by Eric Walter Elst
Named minor planets
5489
19890302